Kurtziella acanthodes is a species of sea snail, a marine gastropod mollusk in the family Mangeliidae.

This species is considered by Tucker as a synonym of Kurtziella serga (Dall, W.H., 1881)

Description
(Original description) Shell.—
The high and narrow shell has a biconical shape and is ribbed and spiralled. Its colour is a frosted-white,. The spire is subscalar, blunt but small-pointed. It has a small body whorl and aperture, and a rather contracted base.

Sculpture: Longitudinals—on the body whorl there are 14, on the penultimate whorl 10, and on the first regular whorl 9 ribs. They arise very feebly at the suture, gain height in the sinus-area, and add on a little breadth below.  They are high, narrow, and rounded toward the aperture they are crowded, but in general they are parted by rounded furrows of two or three times their width. They extend to the extreme point of the base, but not to the snout. The whole surface is likewise fretted with minute sharp lines of growth. Spirals—on the embryonic whorls there is one, on the other whorls two, fine spiral threads. The upper and stronger lies below the sinus-area about one-third down the whorl, and forms, with help of an angulation at that point, a rather sharp keel, rising into small sharp tubercles at the intersections of the ribs. Between this keel and the root of the snout there are on the body whorl six weaker threads, which all rise into tubercles as they cross the ribs. On the snout are three or four weaker threads without tubercles. The interstices of these spirals are from twice to four times their width. The whole surface of the shell, except the embryonic whorls, is scored with very fine, sharp, close-set spirals, which, at crossing the lines of growth, are beset with microscopic blunt prickles
which give the frosted aspect to the shell.

The colour of the shell is white, only the tip is smooth.

The spire is conical, scalar, in consequence of the drooping projecting shoulder at the top of each whorl. The protoconch consists of 3½ embryonic whorls, which are conically globose, smooth, keeled, closely, roundedly ribbed, with a deepish suture, and rise to a minute point (crushed). The whorls number 8½ in all, a little bunchy and disorderly. They have a long slightly drooping shoulder defined by the keel, below which they are cylindrical, with a slight contraction into the lower suture. The body whorl is small, with a contracting scarcely convex base, prolonged into a small, but distinct, and somewhat cylindrical snout. The suture is small, slightly impressed. The aperture is small, narrow, slightly pear-shaped, oblique, triangular above, prolonged into the small siphonal canal below. The outer lip is flat at the shoulder, angulated at the keel, slightly convex below this. The edge projects thinly beyond the last longitudinal rib, which serves as a varix . It presents a flattened, but regular curve from the point of the shell to the keel, where the edge forms a little shoulder, between which and the body lies the narrow round small sinus, with its flanged border. The inner lip is straight, with a very thin narrow glaze which early runs out to the rim, being cut off by the slightly oblique and twisted edge, which continues with a slight patulous margin to the point of the shell.

Distribution
This marine species occurs off the Bermudas and the Azores.

References

External links
  Tucker, J.K. 2004 Catalog of recent and fossil turrids (Mollusca: Gastropoda). Zootaxa 682:1–1295.

acanthodes
Gastropods described in 1881